Tifallili is a stream in the U.S. states of Alabama and Mississippi.

Tifallili is a name derived from the Choctaw language meaning "tall dead tree".

References

Rivers of Alabama
Rivers of Sumter County, Alabama
Rivers of Mississippi
Rivers of Kemper County, Mississippi
Mississippi placenames of Native American origin
Alabama placenames of Native American origin